Harshit is an Indian masculine given name. Notable people with the name include:
Harshit Shatrughan Bisht (born 1999), Indian cricketer
Harshit Rana (born 2001), Indian cricketer
Harshit Rathod,  (born 1998), Indian cricketer
Harshit Saini, Indian cricketer
Harshit Saxena (born 1985), Indian singer and composer

See also 

 Harshita

Indian masculine given names